Chermaine Poo (born October 1, 1978) is a Malaysian actress, emcee and TV host.

Chermaine is a qualified Chartered Accountant (“CA”) by profession, having three accountancy qualifications under her belt. She graduated with a double major degree, BA (Hons) in Accounting & Finance, UK at the age of 19.

Chermaine owns the company Chermaine Poo Productions and was named “Emerging Woman of the Year” in 2012 by the prestigious international accounting firm.

Qualifications
Chermaine is a Chartered Accountant (“CA”) by profession. She is a member of the Malaysian Institute of Accountants, as well as the Association of Chartered Certified Accountants (UK).

Career

Corporate finance
 Trained with the largest investment bank in Malaysia; and
 Big Five international accounting firm
 Involved in preparing IPOs, restructuring, receivership and setting up a billion-ringgit infrastructure fund

Beauty pageantry
Chermaine was a second runner-up in the Miss Universe Malaysia 2005, where she also won three subsidiary titles – Miss Beautiful, Miss Natural Beauty and Miss Crowning Glory.

Acting
Chermaine has acted in numerous Malaysian movies and local dramas.

Movies
 Culik
 Jin Notti (with Mawi, Fara Fauzana)
 The Funeral Party
 London Calling
 Lust! Caution (Directed by Ang Lee)
 DUKUN
 Kurnia
 Orange for Mama

Dramas
 Bait Cinta](Erra Shazira)
 Tudung Express (with Lisa Surihani, Julia Ziegler, Linda Hashim)
 Pertama Ramadan Akan Datang
 Timeless Season
 The Beginning
 Anak Pontianak
 Malaysian Talents.Com

TV hosting
Chermaine hosts her own weekly TV programme on The Breakfast Show called “Mind Your Money with Chermaine Poo” as well as  “Miracle Makers” on NTV7.

Other TV programmes that she has hosted, among others, are:
 Motorcross Championship 2008-2012
 Asian Festival of Speed 2008-2012
 Dapur Nyonya on TV3 with Chef Florence
 The Breakfast Show – 2009–2012 on NTV7

Writing
Chermaine contributes regularly to The Star newspaper in her weekly column, “Mind Your Money with Chermaine Poo”

Emceeing
Since starting in 2007, Chermaine has emceed countless events, ranging from but not limited to:
 Foreign language
 Corporate
 Protocol
 Annual dinner
 Fashion and lifestyle
 Fashion shows
 Luxury brands
 Electronic gadgets
 Pageantry
 Hair, make-up and fragrances
 Film festivals
 Awards ceremonies
 Motorsports
 Food and beverage
 Property
 Health/fitness and sports

Philanthropy
Chermaine actively runs her charity, “Chermaine Poo’s Cupcakes for Charity”, which was founded in December 2011. She has also been involved in many charity events and environmental awareness initiatives, among others:
 World Aids Day
 MAC Aids Fund
 Cleaner, Greener Penang Campaign
 Tabung Pulih Kasih
 Save the Fins with KLCC Aquaria
 Earth Hour with Sunway Pyramid 2008-2012
 Project Liber8 (Stop Human Trafficking)

Public image
"Chermaine Poo - Chartered Accountant, Car Chick, Cupcake Connoisseur"
Over the years, the media and entertainment industry have described her as:
 A Beauty with Brains
 A highly qualified Chartered Accountant turned Actress/Emcee/TV Host
 A young and successful professional;
 Who has wide corporate, social and media contacts
 Who comes from a loving and close-knit family
 Who promotes good moral values, ethics and a healthy lifestyle
 And now, “Beauty and Brains with a Heart”.

External links
 Official Website
 Emerging Woman Entrepreneur of the Year
 Chermaine Poo's Cupcakes for Charity (3C's)
 Mind Your Money with Chermaine Poo
 Celebrity helps to raise RM18,000 for Shelter Home

References

Living people
Malaysian women in business
Malaysian beauty pageant winners
Malaysian actresses
Malaysian people of Chinese descent
Malaysian Buddhists
People from Kuala Lumpur
1978 births
Malaysian businesspeople